Making out refers to various casual sexual behaviors including kissing and petting.

Making Out or Make Out may also refer to:
 Makeout (band), an American pop punk band
 Make Out (band), an American pop rock band
 Making Out (TV series), a British television series
 Making Out (book series), a series of young adult novels
 Makin' Out (album), a 1961 album by John Wright
 "Making Out" (song), by No Doubt from the album Rock Steady

See also